Mickey Matson and the Copperhead Conspiracy is a 2012 American family adventure-comedy film with the descendants of a treasonous band of Civil War villains known as Copperheads serving as the antagonists. The film's primary artifact is a Petoskey stone, which is also the state stone of Michigan.

Plot 
The film's protagonist, young Mickey Matson (Derek Brandon), discovers a map encoded upon a Petoskey stone left to him by his late Grandpa Jack (Christopher Lloyd). The adventure, taking Mickey Matson and Sully Braginton (Francesca DeRosa) from one clue to the next as they summon the courage to prevent the destruction of home and country. Plot development includes flashback scenes to the Lincoln presidential era and the Civil War.

Cast 
 Derek Brandon as Mickey Matson (known for Rodeo Girl)
 Francesca DeRosa as Sully Braginton
 Patrika Darbo as Grams
 Christopher Lloyd as Grandpa Jack
 Ernie Hudson as Ivan Stumpwater
 Lee Arenberg as Billy Lee
 Frank Drank as Jeremiah
 Kevin Yon as Buckshot Plindenberg
 Rick Plummer as Stalwart Priggish III

Production 
Mickey Matson and the Copperhead Conspiracy was approved for a Michigan film industry incentive award. Primarily filmed at 10 West Studios in Manistee, Michigan, location landmarks in Mickey Matson and the Copperhead Conspiracy include the Ramsdell Theatre in Manistee and White Pine Village in Ludington.

Soundtrack 
Composer Will Musser provided the score for Mickey Matson and the Copperhead Conspiracy including three titled works. Sara Niemietz, Edgar Struble, and Tom Stype wrote the song, "Never On My Own". Engineered, mixed and mastered by Luke Rangel, Sara Niemietz performed "Never On My Own" for the closing credits.

Release 
Mickey Matson and the Copperhead Conspiracy held a red carpet premier on May 10, 2012 at the Celebration! Cinema Grand Rapids North, in Grand Rapids, Michigan.

Home media retitle
For the DVD release on July 16, 2013, Walmart retailing personnel suggested changing the film name to The Adventures of Mickey Matson and the Copperhead Treasure, advising that the term, "Treasure" would be more clearly understood by younger viewers than the term, "Conspiracy". It was also suggested, "The Adventures of..." be added to the title for higher visibility, keying on the word "Adventure" would categorize the film under "A" in digital listings.  The film's writer and producer, Harold Cronk commented, "...We’re not arrogant enough to think we know more than the largest retailer on the planet Earth. We like to work with people. We think it’s going to be a great partnership.”

Reception 
The Dove Foundation gives Mickey Matson and the Copperhead Conspiracy a four Dove rating, the film is "Dove Family-Approved, Suitable for all ages". ChristianCinimea.com movie reviewer, Edwin L. Carpenter writes: "This movie is a delightful journey into the imagination!  When you have a story which has its roots in President Lincoln and the Civil War, a boy and a girl, bad guys, a quest for three elements which could cause great harm, and the wonderful Christopher Lloyd as Grandpa Jack, what's not to like?"

References

External links 
 Mickey Matson and the Copperhead Conspiracy
 

2012 films
2010s adventure comedy-drama films
10 West Studios films
Films shot in Michigan
American adventure comedy-drama films
Films directed by Harold Cronk
2012 comedy films
2012 drama films
2010s English-language films
2010s American films